The 2016 Dakar Rally was the 38th edition of the event and the eighth successive year that the event was held in South America. The event started in Buenos Aires, Argentina on January 2, then ran through Argentina and Bolivia.

Sébastien Loeb and Mikko Hirvonen made their debuts in rally-raid, driving for Peugeot and MINI respectively.

The victory in cars category was contested in court by runner-up X-Raid Team.

History
ASO soon faced problems planning the 2016 rally. Chile refused to take the rally, the first time since Dakar is being held in South America, and then, with just 4 months to the start, Peru also refused to take the rally. Without Atacama Desert and Andes, the rally was mainly based in Argentina with many fast stages on closed narrow tracks WRC style, and a lack of stages in full open terrain with heavy navigation issues.

The biggest issue that the competitors faced was the weather phenomenon El Niño which shortened most of the stages due to heavy rain (in first week) and massive heat (in the second one). All these problems led to a big criticism and made Dakar director Étienne Lavigne announce a possible change of the rally to Southern Africa, aiming to put pressure on South American countries. Later, he would announce that the rally would remain in South  America, and was looking for new countries.

The rally was won by 2015 rookie Toby Price, continuing the KTM dominance, with Honda still suffering from a lack of reliability. Patronelli brothers dominated in Quads (this time by Marcus), while Peugeot returned with a better car than the rivals, as the Peugeot 2008 DKR led from the first real stage until the end of the rally. The debutant Sébastien Loeb dominated the first week, but in the end, the victory went to Mr. Dakar Stephane Peterhansel. Gerard de Rooy won the Dakar again, putting an end to Kamaz dominance.

Honda was the biggest disappointment of the rally, showing it is still far from KTM. The difference between Mini and the new Peugeot was huge, and the best Toyotas ever, are still away from its competitors. After dominating the last Dakar last races, it was a surprise to see Kamaz so far from the lead.

Controversies
Most of the following stages were modified due to rain or heat which caused the competitive sectors to be shortened. In addition to the discussion regarding the need for the cancellations, the most controversy was generated by the [apparent] double standards of the organization. In stage seven, the ASO decided to cancel the second timed sector, although 22 riders had already reached the finish line, with all bike and quad riders staying within the time of the first sector. In stage 9, there was another cancellation of the second timed sector when 12 bike riders had already finished. But this time ASO initially considered the time of the first sector, and then changed the stage classification, with the time at the end of the second sector for those 12 riders who finished and assigning the remaining riders a theoretical time of 34 minutes more than the first contestant. Then at the end of the next stage, the penalty to Paulo Gonçalves for repairing his bike in the previous stage was given and taken away. He was out of the race because his bike broke at the end of the first sector, but when the second sector was canceled, he was again in the race. Then more than 24 hours later, he received a penalty for repairing the bike after the second sector.

This Dakar was also marked by several accidents involving assistance trucks, causing some deaths among the local population. The reason given by the crews was the lack of sleep since in most of the stages they had to drive for about 20 hours between bivouacs.

The most controversial moment was reserved for the finish with X-Raid appealing to the French Sports Court, claiming Stephane Peterhansel had an illegal refuel in stage 8, leaving the victory decision to be taken in the court. In stage 8, Peterhansel took advantage of a neutralized section and started the race with less fuel, refueling in the neutralized section. X-Raid immediately contested the decision, since several drivers such as Nasser Al-Aiyah or even Sainz and Loeb had to reduce the pace in order to save some fuel, due to the extension of the stage, but ASO stewards acquitted Peterhansel.

Entries

Bikes

Cars

Quads

Trucks

Stages
Distance according to the official website.

Notes:
 M: Marathon Stage (without assistance park).
 Prologue neutralized after car accident, preventing trucks to run.
 Stage 1 cancelled due to bad weather.
 Stage 2 shortened due to bad weather.
 Stage 3 shortened due to bad weather. The trucks stage was then neutralized after second waypoint due to track abatement.
 Stage 7 shortened for bikes and quads due to bad weather (second timed sector cancelled).
 Stage 9 and 11 shortened due to massive heat.
 Stage 10 shortened due to high water river.

Summary

The race started with an 11 km prologue in Buenos Aires, marked by an accident when a car driver went through the spectators injuring 10 people, with the organization neutralizing the race for the remaining competitors.
The first "real" stage was cancelled due to bad weather. Due to the same reason, the second and third stages were shortened about 100 km. The third stage for trucks was shortened a second time after a part of the track collapsed due to the heavy rain.
The fourth and fifth stages were the two legs of 2016 Dakar first Marathon stage, with the innovation this year of vehicles entering a closed park at the end of the first leg, with the competitors being unable to do repair and maintenance work, even without assistance. Stage 7 was one of the most dramatic. First, the return to Argentina and El Niño, cancelling the second time sector for Bikes and Quads. Then  of Matthias Walkner's serious accident and the crash of Lionel Baud's Mitsubishi, killing one spectator in Bolivia. The extreme heat led to stages 9 and 11 being shortened while the last 33 km of stage 10 was cancelled due to rain-flooded rivers.

Bikes
This was the first race without Cyril Despres and Marc Coma who had dominated the 10 previous editions. It was expected a full open race with a large group of candidates to the victory across KTM and Honda but soon Husqvarna (competing with KTM bikes) reinforced by the candidate Ruben Faria joined for the victory while Yamaha (which lost some of its most valued competitors but assisted of the return of Hélder Rodrigues) played a secondary role. Sherco was also expecting for a surprise mainly from Alain Duclos

Joan Barreda started the rally with a strong pace, as usual, and won the prologue, setting the fastest time in the 3rd and 4th stages, but was given two penalties for speeding in the connections. This led to the victory of the Argentinian rookie Kevin Benavides and the leadership of the privateer Štefan Svitko in the 3rd stage. In stage 4 a double for Portugal with Paulo Gonçalves winning the stage ahead of Ruben Faria, and securing the lead. Victories on stages 5 and 6 for KTM Toby Price but Gonçalves was still in the lead. On stage 6, an accident led to the retirement of Ruben Faria with a broken wrist when he was 7th overall, and Joan Barreda lost all the chances of winning the 2016 Dakar when mechanical problems caused a finish five hours behind Price.

In stage 7, the retirement of two victory candidates: Joan Barreda,  who refused to continue after the heavy loss of time the day before, despite the bike being in good condition and  Matthias Walkner, who had an accident which led to his retirement with a broken femur. Gonçalves was the first rider to arrive and stayed until the medical rescue arrived. Later the organization took out the 10,53 minutes he stayed with his rival. Antoine Méo won the stage and Gonçalves increased the lead over Toby Price. Svitko was third before the rest day.

In stage 8, another victory for Price, while Gonçalves, who suffered a spectacular accident but still took his Honda to finish second in the stage.
In the next stage more problems for Gonçalves with a puncture in the heat exchanger in the second sector. He managed to pull through the bivouac, losing 30 minutes and falling to third place overall. Since it was a marathon stage (but without closed-park as stage 4), Gonçalves repaired the bike with the help of Honda teammates and the Portuguese Mário Patrão, without replacing the motor and avoiding the respective penalty. However, the organization still applied an almost 40-minute penalty at the end of stage 10, ending Gonçalves victory aspirations.

In stage 10 Price managed his huge lead and the private driver Štefan Svitko took the victory. In the following stage another dramatic day for Gonçalves. Being informed of the penalty due to stage 9, Gonçalves attack from the beginning of the stage, but soon he crashed, crashing again at km 118, and suffering a head trauma leading to his retirement. Svitko and Benavides lost time to Antoine Méo and Price.

In stage 12 the first win for a bike that was not  KTM or Honda - the Hélder Rodrigues Yamaha, while stage 13 was the time of Pablo Quintanilla's Husqvarna.

Quads
2016 was the return of the Patronelli brothers, who have dominated the South American Dakar between 2010 and 2013. But it was the 2014 champion Ignacio Casale who dominated the start of the race sweeping the first stages. The rookie Brian Baragwanath was the hero of stage 3, winning after being second on stage 2. In stage 4, what could have been the first win for Marcus Patronelli was later a win for Italian, Juan Carlos Carignani, after the organisation cancelled the last timed section. The marathon's second stage leg promoted a revolution on quads ranking, with some crashes and mechanical problems leading to many withdrawals such as Marcelo Medeiros (third overall) Rafal Sonik (defending champion) and Qatari Abu-Issa. The 2014 winner, Ignacio Casale lost a huge amount of time to Alexis Hernandez, the winner of the day. The surprising Russian rider, Sergey Karyakin took the lead. In stage 6, finally, the return of Patronelli brothers, with Marcos winning ahead of Alejandro, who climbed to the top of the general classification, on the day of Casale's retirement due to a broken clavicle after a crash. In stage 7, the victory went for Lucas Bonetto, with no significant changes overall.

In the second week of the race, the Patronelli brothers finished almost all stages in the top-3 increasing their lead.

Cars
The Mini army faced the South African Toyotas and the return of Peugeot with a fully renovated 2008 DKR after the 2015 in race tests. In 2016, the Peugeot 2008 DKR dominated the race with 9 stage wins out of 12 run stages, leading from the first real stage till the end.
The prologue was just a warm-up with the competitors finishing with little differences, but in the WRC style stages 2 and 3, the debutant Sébastien Loeb showed his class, in a 1-2 finish for Peugeot, despite the track being more favorable to the 4WD vehicles.
In the high mountain stage 4, a 1-2-3 for Peugeot (first win for Stéphane Peterhansel with a Peugeot, its 33rd win in cars, 66th overall and 50th stage win for Peugeot) who secure also the fifth place, with just the Nasser Al-Attiyah's Mini in the middle, demonstrating the profit of 2008 DKR improvements. Fifth stage, one more win for Sébastien Loeb (his third) and one more 1-2-3 for Peugeot. In the sixth stage, another double for Peugeot with Peterhansel finishing ahead of Carlos Sainz. Loeb had to change two flat tires and lost the leadership to Peterhansel.
Stage 7 and 7 wins for Peugeot, this time for Carlos Sainz. Peterhanse was 4th and lost the lead for Loeb (second on the stage). Al-Attiyah was the best non-Peugeot (third in the stage, fourth overall behind the French army). The prologue winner saw his Toyota burning to the ground and went home earlier.

After the rest day the problems started for Loeb, sticking first in the sand and then capsizing his cars in a dry river. He managed to drive to the end, but losing 1h30min. It was the first Mini victory, for Al-Attiyah, third overall, behind Peterhansel and Sainz.
In stage 9 Loeb got stuck again while Peterhansel suffered a puncture. Al-Attiyah was only fifth, while Sainz won the ahead of Erick Van Loon and Hirvonen, both on Mini, and took the race lead.
In stage 10 both Van Loon and Al-Attiyah capsized their Mini's while Sainz had to retire with gearbox problems. Peterhansel took the lead again, with one hour over Al-Attiyah (second) with the most difficult stages completed.
in the following stage Peterhansel managed his lead, while Loeb suffered again with mechanical problems, being towed by Després, but still finishing second on the stage. Nasser Al-Attiyah had transmission problems, finishing the stage with only two driving wheels, but winning anyway. at the end of the stage, the electric car Aciona, had to retire after 11 stages, stopping at each 200 km to charge its 14.000 batteries.
In stage 12 the first win for Hirvonen ahead Nasser, in the first day without a Peugeot on top-3.
Loeb finish the rally as he started it: winning stage 13.

Thus, Loeb won 4 stages, Petehansel 3, Sainz 2, Al-Attiyah 2 and Hirvonen 1.

Trucks
After the dominance of Kamaz in the previous editions, it was a great surprise to see the Russian monsters in the middle of the rankings in the first stages.
The race for the Dakar heavy-weights, didn't start before stage 2 (due to a car accident in Prologue which stopped the remaining competitors to race, and the cancelation of stage 1 due to bad weather).
MAN dominated the first stages, with Hans Stacey setting the fastest time in stage 3, but received a 2-minutes penalty. He and his teammate Peter Versluis alternated in the leadership in the first stages. Victories for the Martin Kolomý's Tatra in stage 3 and de Rooy's Iveco in stage 4 showed the competitiveness of 2016 Dakar. Former rally driver Federico Villagra with an amazing regularity was the best Iveco (and non MAN), in third position. In stage 5, the retirement of Ales Loprais and the return of Kamaz to the victories, with Eduard Nikolaev. Villagra took the leadership, but lost some time in stage 6, and Hans Stacey took the victory and the race leadership.
On stage 7 another victory for Nikolaev and his Kamaz. Stacey lost some time and fell into fifth position, while Versluis climb to first, followed by De Rooy and the two Kamaz. Villagra also had problem in the stage and fell to sixth.

De Rooy won stage 8 while Versluis, Stacey and Villagra lost much time. On stage 9 another victory for De Rooy and more problems for Versluis (only 12 on the stage). Like Peterhansel, De Rooy was very close to final victory, leading all his rivals, finishing behind the surprise Pascal de Baar Rennault's. De Rooy was one hour ahead everybody on overall.

In stage 11 De Rooy managed his lead and the stage win went for Nikolaev Kamaz. Versluis won stage 12 but he was far away from overall top-3.

Stage results

Bikes

Quads

Cars

Trucks

Final standings

Bikes

Quads

Cars

Trucks

References

External links
 

Dakar Rally
Dakar Rally
Dakar Rally
Dakar Rally
 Sports competitions in Buenos Aires
Dakar Rally